Deux femmes sur la route (English: Two Women On The Road) is a 2007 drama film directed by Farida Bourquia.

Synopsis 
Amina is trying to reach Tetouan where her husband has been arrested and imprisoned for drug trafficking. When her car breaks down, she meets Lalla Rahma, who is also trying to get to Tetouan in hopes of hoping to finding out what happened to her son, who left as a stowaway on a boat to Europe. Bound by their despair, the two women take the bus together.

Cast 

 Mouna Fettou
 Mohamed Bastaoui
 Aïcha Mahmah
 Mohamed Khouyi

References

External links 
 

Moroccan drama films
2007 films
2007 drama films